Hole Rößler (born 17 April 1949) is a German modern pentathlete. He competed for West Germany at the 1972 Summer Olympics.

References

External links
 

1949 births
Living people
German male modern pentathletes
Olympic modern pentathletes of West Germany
Modern pentathletes at the 1972 Summer Olympics
People from Schleswig, Schleswig-Holstein
Sportspeople from Schleswig-Holstein